Mohammad Iranpourian (born September 21, 1985) is an Iranian football player who plays for Persian Gulf Pro League.

Career
Iranpourian joined Moghavemat Sepasi in 2008.

Tractor
In 2012, he joined Tractor and was named club captain in 2015. In May 2015 he finished runners–up in the Persian Gulf Pro League with the club.

Club career statistics

 Assist Goals

Honours

Club 
 Tractor
 Iran Pro League : 2012–13 Runner up , 2014–15 Runner-up
 Hazfi Cup (1) : 2013–14

Individual 
Persian Gulf Pro League Team of the Season (1) : 2016-17

References

1985 births
Living people
Iranian footballers
Fajr Sepasi players
Shahrdari Tabriz players
Tractor S.C. players
Persian Gulf Pro League players
Association football fullbacks